Zavoy Nunatak (‘Nunatak Zavoy’ \'nu-na-tak za-'voy\) is the mostly ice-free rocky ridge extending 2.8 km in north-northwest to south-southeast direction and 1.4 km wide, rising to 920 m on the west side of Elgar Uplands in northern Alexander Island, Antarctica. It surmounts Nichols Snowfield to the northwest, Gilbert Glacier to the southwest, and the head of Bartók Glacier to the southeast.  The vicinity was visited on 30 January 1988 by the geological survey team of Christo Pimpirev and Borislav Kamenov (First Bulgarian Antarctic Expedition), and Philip Nell and Peter Marquis (British Antarctic Survey).

The feature is named after the settlement of Zavoy in Southeastern Bulgaria.

Location

Maps
 British Antarctic Territory. Scale 1:200000 topographic map. DOS 610 – W 69 70. Tolworth, UK, 1971
 Antarctic Digital Database (ADD). Scale 1:250000 topographic map of Antarctica. Scientific Committee on Antarctic Research (SCAR). Since 1993, regularly upgraded and updated

Notes

References
 Bulgarian Antarctic Gazetteer. Antarctic Place-names Commission. (details in Bulgarian, basic data in English)
 Zavoy Nunatak. SCAR Composite Gazetteer of Antarctica

External links
 Zavoy Nunatak. Copernix satellite image

Nunataks of Alexander Island
Bulgaria and the Antarctic